Sybra rouyeri is a species of beetle in the family Cerambycidae. It was described by Pic in 1938. It is known from Borneo and Java.

References

rouyeri
Beetles described in 1938